Ménétréol may refer to two communes in the Cher department, central France:

Ménétréol-sous-Sancerre
Ménétréol-sur-Sauldre